Smartwrap is an ultra-thin polymer-based material made by James Timberlake and Stephen Kieran of Philadelphia architecture firm KieranTimberlake.

The compound consists of substrate and printed and laminated layers that have been roll-coated into a single film. The resulting film has the capacity to change color and appearance, as well as to provide shelter, control interior climates, and offer light and electricity.

Technical fabrics